"Money Talks" is a song by the British rock band The Kinks. Written by Ray Davies, the song appeared on the band's critically panned album, Preservation Act 2.

Lyrics

The lyrics of "Money Talks" are part of the story-line of Preservation Act 2. As described by author Andrew Hickey, the track is "just a description of Flash's 'philosophy' - that no one is incorruptible and that anyone will do anything for enough money."

Release

"Money Talks" was released on the album Preservation Act 2, where it was the fourth track on the first side. That same month, the song saw single release in America (as well as Japan and Germany), backed with "Here Comes Flash" (which had appeared on the previous album, Preservation Act 1.) The single was not met with much success, like many Kinks singles of the period, as it did not chart in any country.

Reception

Cash Box said that the Kinks "come dynamically across with a strong rocker, capturing a strong T. Rex-Rolling Stones feel throughout" also saying that "infectious as a disk can be, this one is really saying something.."

"Money Talks" has generally received positive reviews from critics. Jason Josephes of Pitchfork Media called the song "one of the many standout cuts on [Preservation Act 2]" and said that "Money Talks" is an example of "[Ray Davies's] stickiness serating <sic> Preservation with a witty edge, with can't- wait- to- quote lyrics popping up all over the place."
Andrew Hickey called the track "one of the catchiest things on Preservation Act 2."

References

The Kinks songs
1974 songs
1974 singles
Songs written by Ray Davies
Song recordings produced by Ray Davies
RCA Records singles